Victor P. Dauer (April 14, 1909 – September 30, 2000) was an American football and baseball coach and college athletics administrator.  He served as the head football and head baseball coach at Valparaiso University during the 1941–42 academic year.

Dauer was born on April 14, 1909, in Hammond, Indiana.  He graduated from Emerson High School in Gary, Indiana.  He played college football and college basketball at Indiana University Bloomington.

Dauer served in the United States Army during World War II.  In 1947, he was appointed assistant professor and assistant athletic director Springfield College in Springfield, Massachusetts.  In 1949, he moved to Washington State University as an assistant professor in the Men's Physical Education Department.  Dauer earned a PhD in education from the University of Michigan in 1951.

Head coaching record

College football

References

1909 births
2000 deaths
Indiana Hoosiers football players
Indiana Hoosiers men's basketball players
Springfield College (Massachusetts) faculty
University of Michigan School of Education alumni
Valparaiso Beacons athletic directors
Valparaiso Beacons baseball coaches
Valparaiso Beacons football coaches
Washington State University faculty
High school football coaches in Indiana
United States Army personnel of World War II
Sportspeople from Gary, Indiana
Sportspeople from Hammond, Indiana
Players of American football from Gary, Indiana
Basketball players from Gary, Indiana